Reino A. Perala (1915-2002) was a member of the Wisconsin State Assembly.

Biography
Perala was born on August 28, 1915, in Maple, Wisconsin. He was blind and graduated from the Wisconsin Center for the Blind and Visually Impaired before attending the University of Wisconsin–Superior and the University of Wisconsin–Madison. Perala died on February 25, 2002.

Career
Perala received his bachelor's degree and law degrees from University of Wisconsin–Madison. He practiced law and owned a hotel in Superior, Wisconsin. He was a justice of the peace. Perala was a member of the Assembly from 1953 to 1968. He was a Democrat.

References

People from Douglas County, Wisconsin
Politicians from Superior, Wisconsin
Democratic Party members of the Wisconsin State Assembly
American politicians with disabilities
American blind people
Blind politicians
Wisconsin state court judges
University of Wisconsin–Superior alumni
University of Wisconsin–Madison alumni
University of Wisconsin Law School alumni
Wisconsin lawyers
Businesspeople from Wisconsin
1915 births
2002 deaths
20th-century American judges
20th-century American politicians
20th-century American businesspeople
20th-century American lawyers